Sainte-Marthe-du-Cap is a former town in Quebec, Canada on the St. Lawrence River. It was amalgamated into the City of Trois-Rivières in 2002. Population (2001 census) 6,192.

Populated places disestablished in 2002
Neighbourhoods in Trois-Rivières
Former cities in Quebec